Loliem railway station (Station code: LOL) a railway station in Goa, under the jurisdiction of Konkan Railway.

Administration
It lies is in Loliem-Polem village in the sub-district of Canacona and is under Karwar railway division of Konkan Railway zone, a subsidiary zone of Indian Railways.

History
The establishment of this station was announced in September 2011, nearly a decade-and-half after the railway was commissioned in 1997. A brief newspaper announcement simply said that a new railway station at Loliem between the existing stations of Asnoti (Karnataka) and Canacona (Goa) was being set up by the Konkan Railway Corporation and it would "facilitate many locals who commute from Loliem-Polem to Margao everyday". The announcement was made by Konkan Railway Corporation's managing director B P Tayal.

Other stations
Madgaon (locally spelt in English more often as Margao) railway station in South Goa district is the largest Konkan Railway station within Goa, while Thivim railway station in North Goa comes at second place. The former is a gateway to South Goa, Margao, the urban area of Vasco da Gama and also the beaches of South Goa, while the latter is a gateway to Mapusa town, the emigration-oriented sub-district of Bardez and also the North Goa beach belt.  The Karmali railway station is osest State capital Panjim or Panaji, which is the administrative capital of Goa.

References

External links
Photo of Loliem railway station, via Flickr.com

Railway stations in South Goa district
Railway stations along Konkan Railway line
Railway stations opened in 2011
Karwar railway division